Starve Your Dog is a 2015 Moroccan drama film directed by Hicham Lasri. It was screened in the Contemporary World Cinema section of the 2015 Toronto International Film Festival. It was also shown in the Panorama section of the 66th Berlin International Film Festival.

Cast
 Latefa Ahrrare
 Jirari Ben Aissa
 Fehd Benchemsi
 Jalila Temlsi
Adil Abatorab
Salma Eddlimi

References

External links
 

2015 films
2015 drama films
Moroccan drama films
2010s Arabic-language films
Films directed by Hicham Lasri